Rita Lobato Velho Lopes (June 7, 1866 in Rio Grande – January 6, 1954 in Rio Pardo) was the first woman to earn a degree in Brazil to practice medicine. She was the second Brazilian woman physician, following , who earned a degree from the New York Medical College and Hospital for Women in 1881. Lobato received her degree in 1887 from a school in Bahia. Her initial enrollment caused debate, with some people arguing that women had brains too small to understand medicine or that a female doctor would never find a husband, although others were in favor of her entrance and the Echo das Damas
 saw her as an example for Brazilian girls. She did, in fact, marry and practised medicine for several years.

References 

1866 births
1954 deaths
20th-century Brazilian physicians
People from Rio Grande (Rio Grande do Sul)
Brazilian women physicians